Madhava Temple, (Sanskrit:माधव देवालय ), (Odia:ମାଧବ ଦେଉଳ) is the temple dedicated to Lord Vishnu. It is located at the Madhab village of Niali block in Cuttack district, Odisha.

Architecture

The Temple is built in pancharatha design. Three buildings, namely Vimana, Jagamohana and Natamandapa. The Vimana is of Rekha Deula, Jagamohana is of Pidha deula and the Natamandapa is flat-roofed and recently renovated by Archaeological Survey of India. The motifs are of different serpents, naayikas, devatas etc. The temple belongs to 13th century and was built by Eastern Ganga dynasty. The architecture of this temple is very much similar to that of Sakshigopal Temple of Puri and Ananta Vasudev temple of Bhubaneswar. You can find the images of Dasa-Avatar of Vishnu, a big Sudarshan Chakra made up of Black granite stone and also the image of Ananta Sayana of lord Vishnu in the walls of Jagamohana and Natamandapa. The outer walls of the temple are carved with beautiful old Pauranic images from Krishna Lila & Mahabharata. Some erotic carvings can also be found on the outer wall of the temple.

The Deity
The central icon Madhava who  is a rare image. The upper left arm holds Gada, lower left Sudarshana Chakra, upper right full blown Lotus and lower right Shankha. In the Jagamohana a rare image of Durga is found. She is worshipped as the sister of Madhava. Many festivals like Janmashtami, Ekadashi and special festivals in Maagha and Vaishakha month are observed here. The main attraction here is the very old idol of Garuda which is made of black sandstone.

Etymology of the name Maadhava
The Sanskrit bhashya of Vishnu Sahasranama by Adi Shankara says that Paramatma is the owner of Maaya or illusion. And later explanation by Sri Vaishnava scholars say Lakshmi is called Maaya and his husband is Vishnu, so he is Maadhava.(माया श्री, तस्या धवः माधवः इति  ). Most simply, Madhava is a form of lord Vishnu or Krishna.

Location & other issues
It is located at Madhab Village of Niali block in Cuttack district. Regular bus services run from Bhubaneswar and Cuttack to Niali. Although it has rich architecture of traditional Kalinga style, it is being neglected by the Government. It is not included under the projects of Odisha tourism. Anybody who is visiting Madhava temple and wants to offer the God Prasada (offerings) should buy fruits or prasad from nearest Niali market, as no prasad or bhoga stores are available near the temple.

See also
Nilamadhav Temple

References
archaeological survey on Niali Madhava

Hindu temples in Cuttack
Vishnu temples